VLM can refer to:

Veículo Lançador de Microssatélites, a Brazilian launcher of satellites
Very large memory computers
Vic Lee Motorsport, a British motor racing team
Virgin London Marathon
Virtual Light Machine
Virtual Loadable Module, modular drivers of Novell's 16-bit NetWare client for DOS/Windows
Visceral larva migrans (human toxocarosis), a parasitary human disease due by Toxocara cati or Toxocara canis
Visible light microscope, a type of microscope to magnify images by means of visible light
VLM Airlines Slovenia, a sister airline to the Belgian VLM Airlines
VLM Airlines, a defunct Belgian regional airline
vorarlberg museum the former Vorarlberger Landesmuseum in Bregez, Austria
Vortex lattice method, a numerical method used in computational fluid dynamics